Tom Maidhc O'Flaherty (Irish: Tomás Ó Flaithearta, 1889-1936) was an Irish Communist politician in the early 20th century, a supporter of the Trotskyist James P. Cannon, and writer in English and Irish. In 1919, he, along with John Reed, Jim Larkin and others, helped to found the Communist Labor Party, a precursor to the Communist Party USA.

Background

Tom Maidhc O'Flaherty was born at Gort na gCapall in 1889, Inishmore, an island off the west coast of Ireland.  His parents were Maidhc Ó Flaithearta, a well-known Irish nationalist, and Maggie Ganley.  His brother was Liam O'Flaherty. His family, descendants of the Ó Flaithbertaigh family of Connemara, were not well off. The Irish language was widely spoken in the area, and the O'Flahertys spoke both English and Irish from the Gaeltacht.  His sister was Bríd Ní Fhlatharta.

O’Flaherty's education was subsidized by Roger Casement, the British diplomat who exposed slavery in the rubber collection zones of the Belgian Congo and the Putomayo an area in between Peru and Colombia and was later executed in 1916 for his part in the 1916 Rising.

Career

O’Flatherty was a founder member of the Irish Volunteers, a militia formed to further Ireland's independence, and later migrated to the United States, where he became a member of the Industrial Workers of the World (IWW). He was among those who first joined the American Communist Party, where he was an associate of John Reed, James P. Cannon, and William F. Dunne.

He was a columnist for the Daily Worker and was the first editor of the Labour Defender. O'Flaherty was active in the defence of imprisoned Irish labour leader James Larkin and was editor of the left-wing Irish-American paper The Irish People. He left the Communist Party and returned to Ireland in 1934 because of ill-health. There he became editor of the Irish-language left-wing paper An tÉireannach.

Personal life
O'Flaherty's brother, Liam (1896–1984), was an Irish novelist and short-story writer who played an important role in the Irish literary renaissance as well as helping to found the Communist Party of Ireland. His nephew (by his sister, Bríd's Ní Fhlatharta) was Gaelic Athletic Association commentator and writer, Breandán Ó hEithir.

Death
Tom Maidhc O'Flaherty died of heart failure on the Aran Islands in December 1936, aged 47.

Works
Like his brother Liam, O'Flaherty retained a deep interest in the Irish language. Like Liam, he wrote fiction in English and in Irish. His works include two books of short stories: Aranmen All and Cliffmen of the West, and a collection of his short stories in Irish under the title An Bhrachlainn Mhór, published posthumously.

Legacy
O’Flaherty figures in the memoir of Whittaker Chambers, who worked with him at the Daily Worker in New York City.

See also
 Maidhc Ó Flaithearta
 Liam O'Flaherty
 Breandán Ó hEithir
 Whittaker Chambers

References

External sources
 Ó hEithir, Breandán (1991). 'Liam Ó Flaithearta agus a Dhúchas' in An Chaint sa tSráidbhaile. Comhar Teoranta.
 O'Flaherty, Tom (1991 - reprint). Aranmen All. Brandon Book Publishers.
 Robinson, Tim (1995). Stones of Aran: Labyrinth. Lilliput Press.

Politicians from County Galway
1889 births
1936 deaths
Irish communists
American communists
American Trotskyists
Industrial Workers of the World members
Irish emigrants to the United States (before 1923)
Irish writers